Amirabad Special Economic Zone And Port or Amirabad Port of Behshahr (Persian: منطقه ویژه اقتصادی و بندر امیرآباد) is the largest port on the Caspian Sea, and is located in the north of Behshahr County, next to the peninsula and the biosphere reserve of Miankaleh in Iran.

The port has been designed in 3 phases, but until 2023 only the first phase has been fully implemented. 

According to the statistics of unloading and loading of goods in 2020, this port is the fourth largest port in Iran and the largest port in Iran on the shore of the Caspian Sea, after Shahid Rajaei, Imam Khomeini and Qeshm ports.

It is connected to the Iran Railway, benefiting from 15 berths with a capacity of 7.5 million tons and from the connection capacity of the North-South International Transit Corridor (INSTC). The port, with an area of 1060 hectares, is the largest port in northern Iran.

Amirabad Port at a glance 

 Cargo warehouse: 6.5 hectares
 Land Area: 1060 hectares
 Annual Capacity: 7.5 million tons
 Berth: 15 berths about 2600 meters
 Draft: 6 meters
 Internal rail network: 25 km
 Cargo storage area: 200 hectares

References

Ports and harbours of the Caspian Sea
Ports and harbours of Iran
Behshahr County